Sex and Death 101 is a 2007 dark comedy science fiction film written and directed by Daniel Waters, released in the United States on April 4, 2008. The film marks the reunion of writer/director Daniel Waters and Winona Ryder, who previously worked on the 1988 film Heathers, written by Waters.

Plot
Roderick Blank (Simon Baker) is a successful young businessman with a great job as an executive for "Swallows", a high end fast food restaurant chain, and a beautiful fiancée, Fiona Wormwood (Julie Bowen). On the day of his bachelor party, he is emailed a list of all the women he has slept with. Strangely, while the list has 101 names, his fiancée is only number 29.

He assumes the list is a prank, courtesy of his best friends Zack (Neil Flynn) and Lester (Dash Mihok)—until he meets number 30, Carlotta Valdez, who is the stripper at his bachelor party. After sleeping with Carlotta, he realizes the list does, in fact, comprise all of his sexual partners, both past and future. 

This is confirmed by a group of three mysterious named Alpha, Beta and Fred from a group called the Agency, who tell him the list was mistakenly emailed to him. It originates, they say, from a machine that the Agency has which predicts the future. Alpha, the leader, urges Roderick not to tell anyone since it could cause unrest. He also warns him to destroy the list since it could ruin his life, but Roderick ignores this at first.

Roderick cancels his upcoming wedding and begins to sequentially bed all the people on the list. Although he makes a connection with some of the women, he is unable to settle down and is compelled to continue until he has crossed all names off the list. His friends become concerned for his mental well-being and convince him to bury the list. Before he does that, he sees only part of the next name, including "Dr." and the first few letters.

He falls for Lester's charming and quirky veterinarian (Leslie Bibb), after believing she is the next name on the list and finding they have much in common, only to discover that she does not return his feelings, and wants to be "just friends". He digs up the list and discovers she was not listed, after which she has an untimely accidental death. He continues on his mission.

Throughout all this, a female vigilante, nicknamed by the media "Death Nell" (Winona Ryder), has been taking revenge on men who she feels have taken sexual advantage of women. She seduces these men and then drugs them to induce a coma, leaving them behind along with a line of feminist poetry spray painted on the wall or ceiling.

But after her most recent conquest, she accidentally leaves behind her drivers license, exposing her real identity, Gillian De Raisx, to the world. Roderick's precarious mental state is compromised when he realizes the last name on his list is Gillian's.

With twenty more names left on the list, he decides to abandon it altogether and takes up various hobbies to keep him from giving in to temptation. After an accident during a bike ride, he is found by a group of female students (all virgins) from a Catholic college who believe that he has been "divinely delivered" to deflower them. Roderick is unable to resist and catapults himself from number 82 through number 99 in the space of an afternoon. He realizes only one woman is left, and then he remembers the girls' bus driver was number 100.

Knowing that Death Nell is the last person on his list (and that he may not survive a night with her) Roderick tries to change his destiny, first by becoming a shut in, and then by tracking down another Gillian de Raisx in Sydney, Australia. But when he learns that the Agency are close to catching Death Nell, he has a sudden change of heart. Guilt stricken over his treatment of his previous conquests, he decides to face the consequences.

Roderick and Gillian meet in a diner, where they share a meal and conversation. Gillian reveals that she was a Poetry/Chemistry student who married young and was forced to perform degrading sexual favors with her husband, who also physically abused her. After his death, which was inadvertently caused by Gillian, she realized that she could dish out similar punishments to other men who treated women badly.

Gillian reveals that she is exhausted from the whole ordeal and unsure if she has the conviction to continue. Roderick and Gillian connect, and agree to each take the sedative together. They take the pills simultaneously, and spend the night together, with "The End" spray painted on the wall behind them.

The epilogue reveals that Roderick and Gillian survived the pills, and that Gillian's name was not the last on the list because of impending death but rather because Roderick decides to remain monogamous with her. They are happily married and have a son. Death Nell's comatose victims are revived and a brief scene at the Agency suggests that Roderick and Gillian's union was fated.

Cast

 Simon Baker as Roderick Blank
 Winona Ryder as Gillian De Raisx/Death Nell
 Leslie Bibb as Dr. Miranda Storm
 Mindy Cohn as Trixie
 Julie Bowen as Fiona Wormwood
 Dash Mihok as Lester
 Neil Flynn as Zack
 Robert Wisdom as Alpha
 Tanc Sade as Beta
 Patton Oswalt as Fred
 Frances Fisher as Hope Hartlight
 Sophie Monk as Cynthia Rose
 Marshall Bell as Victor Rose III
 Natassia Malthe as Bambi Kidd
 Pollyanna McIntosh as Thumper Wind
 Rob Benedict as Bow Tie Bob
 Jessica Kiper as Precious/Carlotta Valdes
 Winter Ave Zoli as Alexis
 Cindy Pickett as Roderick's Mother
 Nicole Bilderback as Dr. Mirabella Stone
 Keram Malicki-Sanchez as Master Bitchslap
 Retta as Ethel (as Retta Sirleaf)
 Corinne Reilly as Lizzie
 Amanda Walsh as Stewardess Kathleen
 Zachary Gordon as Barbecue Brat
 Indira Varma as Deven Sovor (uncredited)

Critical reception
The film received generally negative reviews from critics. Manohla Dargis of The New York Times dismissed it as an "unfortunate comedy". , review aggregator Rotten Tomatoes reports an approval rating of 27%, based on 41 reviews, with an average score of 4.27/10 and the consensus that the film "aspires to be a clever sex comedy, but has little life behind the sex or the death". Metacritic reported the film had an average score of 24 out of 100, based on twelve reviews.

Awards
The film won the Golden Space Needle Award for Best Director at the Seattle International Film Festival.

References

External links
 
 
 
 
 

2000s sex comedy films
2007 films
American black comedy films
American sex comedy films
2000s English-language films
Films scored by Rolfe Kent
2007 comedy films
Films with screenplays by Daniel Waters (screenwriter)
Films directed by Daniel Waters (screenwriter)
2000s American films